Herman Green House is a historic home located south of Raleigh in Wake County, North Carolina.  It was built about 1911, and is a two-story, three bay, Colonial Revival-style frame dwelling with a slate hipped roof. It is sheathed in weatherboard and has a one-story rear kitchen ell. It features a one-story, hip roof wraparound porch.

It was listed on the National Register of Historic Places in 2003.

References

Houses on the National Register of Historic Places in North Carolina
Colonial Revival architecture in North Carolina
Houses completed in 1911
Houses in Wake County, North Carolina
National Register of Historic Places in Wake County, North Carolina